Youssef El Haddaqui Rabil (born 28 December 1988), commonly known as Youssef El Haddaqui, is a 5-a-side football player from Spain.

Personal 
He was born on 28 December 1988. He has a disability: he is blind and is a B1 type sportsperson.

From the Catalan region of Spain, he was a recipient a 2012 Plan ADO scholarship.

In 2013, he was awarded the bronze Real Orden al Mérito Deportivo.

5-a-side football 
El Haddaqui is affiliated with the FCEC sport federation. In 2011, he represented Spain in the Turkey hosted European Championships.  His team was faced Turkey, Russia and Greece in the group stage. The Italian hosted European Championships was played in June 2012, and were the last major competition for him and his team prior to the start of the Paralympic Games.  He was coached in the competition by Miguel Ángel Becerra, and participated in daily fitness activities to help with preparations for the Championship and Paralympic Games.  On 7 June he took a medical test to clear participation in the Paralympic Games. He played 5-a-side football at the 2012 Summer Paralympics.  His team finished third after they played Argentina and, won 1–0.  The bronze medal game was watched by Infanta Elena and President of the Spanish Paralympic Committee.  In the team's opening game against Great Britain, the game ended in a 1–1 draw.

Notes

References

External links 
 
 

1988 births
Living people
Paralympic 5-a-side footballers of Spain
Paralympic bronze medalists for Spain
Paralympic medalists in football 5-a-side
5-a-side footballers at the 2012 Summer Paralympics
5-a-side footballers at the 2016 Summer Paralympics
Medalists at the 2012 Summer Paralympics
Visually impaired category Paralympic competitors
Plan ADOP alumni